Tin Bider is an impact crater that sits in dry, rugged terrain in Algeria. The crater was formed in the last 70 million years, perhaps in the late Cretaceous or early Tertiary Period. Spanning 6 kilometres, the crater sits at the southern end of a range of hills. The elevated position and concentric rings of Tin Bider suggest that its structure is complex.

Massive sandstones attributable to the Lower Cretaceous, known throughout the Sahara, are only exposed in the craters centre, about 500 meters above its usual stratigraphic position. 

Because of the large prominence of ductile deformation, Tin Bider significantly differs from other craters. While there is yet no conclusive explanation for this unique condition, Tin Bider could provide important information toward a better understanding of large-scale impact cratering.

See also 

 List of impact craters in Africa

References

Further reading 
 Koeberl, C., African meteorite impact craters: Characteristics and geological importance. Journal of African Sciences, v. 18, pp. 263–295. 1994
 Lambert, P., McHone, J.F. Jr., Dietz, R.S., Briedj, M. and Djender,M., Impact and impact-like structures in Algeria. Part II, multi-ringed structures. Meteoritics, v. 16, pp. 203–227. 1981
 McHone, J. F. Jr., Lambert, P., Dietz, R.S. and Briedj, M., Impact structures in Algeria (abstract). Meteoritics, v. 15, pp. 331–332. 1980
 Monod, T., Contribution to a list of circular structures of cryptoexplosive meteoric origin (known, possible, or supposed) (in French). Insitiut Francais d'Afrique Noire (I.F.A.N.), Dakar, Catalogues et documents, v. 18, 96 p. 1965

Impact craters of Algeria
Cretaceous impact craters
Late Cretaceous Africa
Geography of Tamanrasset Province